Henri Charles Raybaud (born 4 June 1879 in Marseille-16 August,1942) was a French sculptor.

He studied in Paris under Gabriel Thomas and Jean-Antoine Injalbert and made his debut at the Paris Salon des Artistes Français in 1904 with the work "Le Berger et la mer" a plaster bas-relief now held by Marseille's Musée des Beaux-Arts.

Main works

Images of Reybaud's bronzes by the Gare Saint-Charles stairway

Main works (continued)

War memorials

References

1879 births
Sculptors from Marseille
19th-century French sculptors
French male sculptors
20th-century French sculptors
Year of death missing
19th-century French male artists